Matthew Russell Wood (born August 15, 1972) is an American sound editor and voice actor. He is a supervising sound editor at Skywalker Sound in Marin County, California. He also provides the voice of General Grievous in the Star Wars franchise.

Career
Starting at Lucasfilm as a game tester at LucasArts, Wood then moved to the company's sound department and worked on all three films of the Star Wars prequel trilogy as supervising sound editor and also did an uncredited acting role in The Phantom Menace as Bib Fortuna and the voice of Ody Mandrell. In Attack of the Clones, he played Seboca and Magaloof. In Star Wars: Episode III – Revenge of the Sith, in addition to a brief appearance as Orn Free Taa, Wood plays the voice role of General Grievous, a role originated by voice actors John DiMaggio and Richard McGonagle in the series Star Wars: Clone Wars. In the film, he dubbed the voice of stuntman Kyle Rowling, who played General Grievous utilizing motion capture.

He would later come back to work with the Star Wars expanded universe. He reprised his voice role of General Grievous in General Grievous Halloween audiocast as well as all video game appearances of Grievous with the exception of Star Wars Battlefront: Elite Squadron where Grievous was played by David W. Collins. He reprised his role as General Grievous and the battle droids in the Star Wars: The Clone Wars film and associated television series. In the series, he once again voiced Grievous as well as Wat Tambor, HELIOS-3D, senate guards, the battle droids and Poggle the Lesser. He provided the voice of RO-GR/Roger, a reprogrammed battle droid in Lego Star Wars: The Freemaker Adventures. He also voiced Bib Fortuna in Star Wars: The Bad Batch.

He has received five Academy Award nominations for Sound Editing: for Paul Thomas Anderson’s There Will Be Blood at the 80th Academy Awards, for the Pixar sci-fi film WALL-E at the 81st Academy Awards, for Star Wars: The Force Awakens at the 88th Academy Awards, for Star Wars: The Last Jedi at the 90th Academy Awards, and for Star Wars: The Rise of Skywalker at the 92nd Academy Awards.

Wood made an appearance in Adult Swim's Robot Chicken in 2008.

Filmography

Sound editing

Voice acting

Film

Television

Video games

References

External links

 Matthew Wood - Skywalker Sound

1972 births
American male video game actors
American male voice actors
Living people
People from the San Francisco Bay Area
20th-century American male actors
21st-century American male actors
Lucasfilm people